Daniel Francisco Tissavak Véliz (born 9 May 1975) is a Chilean former professional footballer who played as a midfielder for clubs in Chile and Indonesia.

Club career
A playmaker, Tissavak is a product of Universidad de Chile youth system, where he coincided with Marcelo Salas as fellow and Manuel Rodríguez Vega as coach. In his homeland, he also played for Deportes La Serena, Unión Santa Cruz, San Luis. and Unión La Calera.

After he moved abroad and spent about four years in the Indonesian football, playing for PSDS Deli Serdang, Persma Manado and PSMS Medan.

International career
Tissavak represented Chile at under-17 level in the 1991 South American Championship alongside well-known players such as Marcelo Salas, Clarence Acuña and Álex Varas. He scored the goal in the 1–0 win against Venezuela.

Personal life
As a football player, he was compared to Diego Maradona by his resemblance and playing style.

Following his retirement as a player, he returned to his homeland and joined Gerdau Aza, a steel company, as a machine operator.

References

External links
 

1979 births
Living people
Footballers from Santiago
Chilean footballers
Chilean expatriate footballers
Chile youth international footballers
Universidad de Chile footballers
Deportes La Serena footballers
Deportes Santa Cruz footballers
San Luis de Quillota footballers
Unión La Calera footballers
PSDS Deli Serdang players
Persma Manado players
PSMS Medan players
Chilean Primera División players
Primera B de Chile players
Tercera División de Chile players
Indonesian Premier Division players
Chilean expatriate sportspeople in Indonesia
Expatriate footballers in Indonesia
Association football midfielders